Progress in Photovoltaics is a monthly peer-reviewed scientific journal covering research on photovoltaics. It is published by John Wiley & Sons and the editor-in-chief is Martin A. Green (University of New South Wales). According to the Journal Citation Reports, the journal has a 2020 impact factor of  7.953, ranking it 17th out of 114 journals in "Energy & Fuels", 21st out of 160 journals in "Physics Applied", and 59th out of 336 journals in "Materials Science Multidisciplinary".

References

External links 
 

Wiley (publisher) academic journals
Publications established in 1993
English-language journals
Energy and fuel journals
Photovoltaics
Monthly journals